Stepan Kirillovich Melnikov (born 25 April 2002) is a Russian football player who plays for FC Rostov.

Club career
He made his debut in the Russian Football National League for FC Spartak-2 Moscow on 6 March 2021 in a game against FC Baltika Kaliningrad.

He made his Russian Premier League debut for Spartak on 29 November 2021 in a game against FC Ufa.

On 20 January 2022, he signed a 4.5-year contract with FC Rostov.

International career
He represented Russia at the 2019 UEFA European Under-17 Championship. He appeared in two games as Russia was eliminated at group stage.

Career statistics

References

External links
 
 Profile by Russian Football National League

2002 births
Footballers from Moscow
Living people
Russian footballers
Russia youth international footballers
Association football midfielders
FC Spartak-2 Moscow players
FC Spartak Moscow players
FC Rostov players
Russian First League players
Russian Premier League players